Walter Malcolm (25 December 1893 – 23 December 1917) was a New Zealand cricketer. He played one first-class match for Otago in 1914/15. He was killed in action during World War I.

See also
 List of Otago representative cricketers
 List of cricketers who were killed during military service

References

External links
 

1893 births
1917 deaths
New Zealand cricketers
Otago cricketers
Cricketers from Blenheim, New Zealand
New Zealand military personnel killed in World War I
New Zealand Military Forces personnel of World War I
New Zealand Army soldiers